The 1900 Rhode Island Rams football team represented the University of Rhode Island in the 1900 college football season. Led by third-year head coach Marshall Tyler, they finished the season with a record of 0–1–2.

Schedule

References

Rhode Island
Rhode Island Rams football seasons
Rhode Island Rams football